Neokaisareia (literally "New Caesarea") is a village and a community of the Katerini municipality. The village was founded in 1928 by Greek refugees coming from the town of Neocaesarea in Pontus.
Before the 2011 local government reform, it was part of the municipality of Katerini, of which it was a municipal district. The 2011 census recorded 445 inhabitants in the village.

See also
 List of settlements in the Pieria regional unit

References

Populated places in Pieria (regional unit)
1928 establishments in Greece